Igor Andreyevich Kobzar (born 13 April 1991) is a Kirgiz-born Russian volleyball player. He is a member of the Russia men's national volleyball team and Russian club Zenit Saint Petersburg.

Sporting achievements

Clubs
 CEV Champions League
  2014/2015 – with Zenit Kazan
  2015/2016 – with Zenit Kazan
  2016/2017 – with Zenit Kazan

 FIVB Club World Championship
  Betim 2015 – with Zenit Kazan
  Betim 2016 – with Zenit Kazan

 National championships
 2012/2013  Russian Cup, with Belogorie Belgorod
 2012/2013  Russian Championship, with Belogorie Belgorod
 2013/2014  Russian Championship, with Zenit Kazan
 2014/2015  Russian Cup, with Zenit Kazan
 2014/2015  Russian Championship, with Zenit Kazan
 2015/2016  Russian SuperCup, with Zenit Kazan
 2015/2016  Russian Cup, with Zenit Kazan
 2015/2016  Russian Championship, with Zenit Kazan
 2016/2017  Russian SuperCup, with Zenit Kazan
 2016/2017  Russian Cup, with Zenit Kazan
 2016/2017  Russian Championship, with Zenit Kazan
 2018/2019  Russian Championship, with Kuzbass Kemerovo
 2019/2020  Russian SuperCup, with Kuzbass Kemerovo

References

External links
 Player profile at CEV.eu
 Player profile at WorldofVolley.com
 Player profile at Volleybox.net

1991 births
Living people
Sportspeople from Surgut
Russian men's volleyball players
Olympic volleyball players of Russia
Volleyball players at the 2016 Summer Olympics
European Games medalists in volleyball
European Games bronze medalists for Russia
Volleyball players at the 2015 European Games
Volleyball players at the 2020 Summer Olympics
Medalists at the 2020 Summer Olympics
Olympic silver medalists for the Russian Olympic Committee athletes
Olympic medalists in volleyball
VC Zenit Saint Petersburg players